Carl Henrik Bjørseth (born 8 February 1968) is a Norwegian orienteering competitor. He received a silver medal in the classic course at the 1999 World Orienteering Championships, and a bronze medal in 2001. He received a silver medal in the relay event in 2001, together with Bernt Bjørnsgaard, Tore Sandvik and Bjørnar Valstad.

He finished 6th in the overall World Cup 1998, and 10th in 2000.

References

External links
 
 

 

1968 births
Living people
Norwegian orienteers
Male orienteers
Foot orienteers
World Orienteering Championships medalists
Sportspeople from Bodø
Competitors at the 2001 World Games
20th-century Norwegian people
21st-century Norwegian people